Man Against Man (German: Mensch gegen Mensch) is a 1924 German silent drama film directed by Hans Steinhoff and starring Alfred Abel, Mady Christians and Tullio Carminati.

The film's sets were designed by the art directors Alfred Junge and Oscar Friedrich Werndorff.

Cast
In alphabetical order
 Alfred Abel
 Olga Belajeff  
 Tullio Carminati 
 Mady Christians  
 Wilhelm Diegelmann
 Heinrich Gotho
 Hans Mierendorff
 Albert Paulig
 Harald Paulsen
 Paul Rehkopf
 Ferdinand von Alten

References

Bibliography
 Grange, William. Cultural Chronicle of the Weimar Republic. Scarecrow Press, 2008.

External links

1924 films
Films of the Weimar Republic
Films directed by Hans Steinhoff
German silent feature films
UFA GmbH films
German black-and-white films
German drama films
1924 drama films
Silent drama films
1920s German films
1920s German-language films